Bo Reichenbach (born January 7, 1988, in Billings, Montana) is an American ice sled hockey player.

Reichenbach is a former U.S. Navy SEAL who was injured by an improvised explosive device in Afghanistan in July 2012.

He was a member of the United States silver medal-winning team at the 2017 World Para Ice Hockey Championships in Gangneung, South Korea.

References

External links 
 
 
 Bo Reichenbach at USA Hockey

1988 births
Living people
American sledge hockey players
Sportspeople from Billings, Montana